Arthur Congreve Miller  (24 January 1877 — 10 March 1947) was an English first-class cricketer and educator.

The son of William Miller, he was born in January 1877 at Bisley, Gloucestershire. He was educated at St Edward's School, Oxford, before matriculating to Selwyn College, Cambridge. After graduating from Cambridge, he held a number of assistant master positions at educational establishments in England, Scotland, and South Africa, before joining the Indian Education Service in July 1911. While in British India, Miller played first-class cricket on two occasions for the Europeans cricket team; the first of these came against the Hindus in the final of the Bombay Triangular Tournament at Bombay in September 1910, with his second appearance coming against the Indians in the Madras Presidency match at Madras in January 1919. He scored 76 runs in his two matches, with a highest score of 45. 

Miller was appointed an education inspector in 1922 and was made an OBE in the 1924 Birthday Honours. The following year, he was made deputy director of public instruction, before being appointed inspector of European schools in Bombay. Miller's final appointment in India was as headmaster of Rajkumar College, Rajkot. After retiring to England, he was resident at Halberton in Devon and was a justice of the peace for the county. In mid-1945, he moved to Milford on Sea in Hampshire, being appointed a justice of the peace for the county. Miller died at a nursing home in Milford on Sea in March 1947.

References

External links

1877 births
1947 deaths
People from Bisley, Gloucestershire
People educated at St Edward's School, Oxford
Alumni of Selwyn College, Cambridge
Schoolteachers from Gloucestershire
Indian Education Service officers
English cricketers
Europeans cricketers
Officers of the Order of the British Empire
Heads of schools in India
English justices of the peace